Natalia Cercheș (born October 3, 1976 in Chișinău) is a Moldovan long-distance runner. She competed in the marathon at the 2012 Summer Olympics, placing 65th with a time of 2:37:13. Her personal best at marathon is 2:33:53 set in Linz.

References

1976 births
Living people
Moldovan female marathon runners
Olympic athletes of Moldova
Athletes (track and field) at the 2004 Summer Olympics
Athletes (track and field) at the 2012 Summer Olympics
Sportspeople from Chișinău
Universiade medalists in athletics (track and field)
Universiade gold medalists for Moldova
Athletes (track and field) at the 2015 European Games
European Games competitors for Moldova